Kennett Square is a borough in Chester County, Pennsylvania. As of the 2020 U.S. census, Kennett Square had a population of 5,943.

Kennett Square is located in the Delaware Valley and considered a suburb of both Philadelphia, the nation's sixth largest city as of 2020, and Wilmington, Delaware. The local high school is Kennett High School. The corporate headquarters of Genesis HealthCare, which administers elderly care facilities, is based in Kennett Square.

The borough is sometimes referred to as the "Mushroom Capital of the World" because mushroom farming in the region produces over 500 million pounds of mushrooms a year, representing half of the nation's mushroom crop production. To celebrate this heritage, Kennett Square holds an annual Mushroom Festival, where the town and its businesses hold a parade, mushroom farm tours, and sells food and other goods.

History
The area to become known as Kennett Square was originally inhabited by the Lenape Native American tribe. Once colonized, the town was named Kennet Square, a reference to Kennett, Cambridgeshire in England with "Square" coming from the original land grant from William Penn, which included one square mile. In 1777, during the American Revolutionary War, Sir William Howe|Sir William Howe, a British Army general led troops  through Kennett Square on their way to the Battle of Brandywine. 

In the 19th century, the borough played an instrumental role in the Underground Railroad, which helped slaves escape the South for freedom. In 1853, a group asked for Kennett Square to be incorporated, and by 1855 it held elections.

Kennett Square's founder is credited with introducing mushroom growing to the area. He grew carnations, a popular local commodity beginning in 1885 and wanted to make use of the wasted space under the elevated beds. He imported spawn from Europe and started experimenting with mushroom cultivation.

In culture
Kennett Square is the subject and setting of The Story of Kennett, an 1866 novel by Bayard Taylor, who was born in Kennett Square.

Geography
Kennett Square is located at  (39.844104, −75.710654). 

Demographics

As of the 2010 census, the borough was 42.8% non-Hispanic White, 7.2% Black or African American, 0.4% Native American, 0.8% Asian, and 3.3% were two or more races. 48.8% of the population were of Hispanic or Latino ancestry.

As of the census, there were 6,072 people, 1,868 households, and 1,242 families residing in the borough. The population density was 4,679.2 people per square mile (1,801.7/km²). There were 1,967 housing units at an average density of 1,745.5 per square mile (672.1/km²). The racial makeup of the borough was 73.58% White, 10.26% African American, 0.09% Native American, 1.63% Asian, 12.48% from other races, and 1.95% from two or more races. Hispanic or Latino of any race were 27.88% of the population.

There were 1,868 households, out of which 30.2% had children under the age of 18 living with them, 48.2% were married couples living together, 11.8% had a female householder with no husband present, and 33.5% were non-families. Of all households 28.2% were made up of individuals, and 11.9% had someone living alone who was 65 years of age or older. The average household size was 2.77 and the average family size was 3.39.

In the borough, the population was spread out, with 24.8% under the age of 18, 10.2% from 18 to 24, 31.0% from 25 to 44, 20.1% from 45 to 64, and 13.8% who were 65 years of age or older. The median age was 35 years. For every 100 females, there were 98.6 males. For every 100 females age 18 and over, there were 96.8 males.

The median income for a household in the borough was $46,523, and the median income for a family was $54,948. Males had a median income of $35,978 versus $27,246 for females. The per capita income for the borough was $22,292. About 7.5% of families and 9.0% of the population were below the poverty line, including 11.9% of those under age 18 and 10.4% of those age 65 or over.

Transportation

Pennsylvania Route 82 is the only numbered highway directly serving the borough. It follows a southeast-to-northwest alignment through the central portion of the borough via South Street and Union Street. U.S. Route 1 bypasses the borough to the north.

Government

The borough is governed by the Council-Manager form of government. There are seven Council Members and a mayor, and all are elected by borough residents. The Borough Manager is an employee of the Borough, hired by the Council.

Events

The Kennett Mushroom Festival is held annually in early September. The festival has been highlighted on Food TV.  Annual parades are held on Memorial Day, Halloween, and before the Christmas holidays.  Kennett Square celebrates Cinco de Mayo, which is organized by Casa Guanajuato, and other local companies. A free summer concert series is held on Wednesday evenings at the beautiful (over 100 acre) Anson B Nixon park. In mid-May, the famous Kennett Run occurs that ends at the Park pavilion. The Kennett Brewfest is held each Fall, featuring unlimited tastings of select brewers pouring different, rare, exclusive, limited, or seasonal beers.  The local art galleries, studios, and independent boutiques participate in First Friday Art Strolls each month, presented by Historic Kennett Square. During temperate months there is an outdoor farmers market at the Genesis Walkway on State St. every Friday afternoon. These are but a few of the events for families and visitors throughout the year.

Education
Kennett Square schools are all part of the Kennett Consolidated School District.  This grouping of districts was the first consolidation of schools in the history of Pennsylvania. Students enrolled in kindergarten attend the Mary D. Lang Kindergarten Center. Grades 1 through 5 attend either Greenwood Elementary, Bancroft Elementary or New Garden Elementary. For grades 6 through 8, all students attend Kennett Middle School. For grades 9 through 12, students then attend Kennett High School.

U.S. Route 1 bypasses Kennett Square just to its north and are assigned to the Unionville-Chadds Ford School District.  Unionville High School, the only one in the Unionville-Chadds Ford School District, is located on Unionville Road (Pennsylvania State Route 82), approximately 2 miles north of the Borough of Kennett Square.

Media
Kennett Square has three local newspapers, The Chester County Press The Kennett Paper, and The Daily Local News. There are also two print magazines, Fig Kennett and Kennett Square Today.

Points of interest
 East Penn Railroad
 Kennett Meetinghouse
 Longwood Gardens
 Talula's Table
 Unionville High School

Notable people
Marino Auriti (1891–1980), artist and mechanic, creator of The Encyclopedic Palace of the World
Justin Best (born 1997), Olympic rower
Pat Ciarrocchi (born 1953), broadcast journalist
Bartholomew Fussell (1794-1871), abolitionist active in the Underground Railroad
Mike Grady, former professional baseball player
Doris Grumbach, former writer
John Honnold, former law professor, University of Pennsylvania Law School
Dugald C. Jackson, electrical engineer, head of Department of Electrical Engineering of the Massachusetts Institute of Technology (MIT) from 1907 to 1935.
Bruce Johnston (criminal) (1939–2002), head of notorious Johnston Gang
Herb Pennock. Hall of Fame baseball pitchere
Jessica Savitch, former broadcast journalist
William Marshall Swayne, former sculptor
Charles Frederick Taylor, Union Army colonel killed at the Battle of Gettysburg
Bayard Taylor, poet and travel writer
Collin Walsh, musician with Grayscale, a pop punk band
Harry Whitney, Arctic hunter, author, and adventurer

See also

 National Register of Historic Places listings in Southern Chester County, Pennsylvania

References

External links

 The Borough of Kennett Square official website
 Historic Kennett Square official website

 
1686 establishments in Pennsylvania
Boroughs in Chester County, Pennsylvania
Populated places established in 1686
Populated places on the Underground Railroad